The Khalil is the 1st son of  Ghoryakhel settled between 1530 and 1535 in Peshawar west Pakistan.
The Khalil is a Pashtun Ghoryakhel subtribe primarily living in the Peshawar Valley of Khyber Pakhtunkhwa, Pakistan, with some members in  Nangarhar,  Herat,  Ghazni, and Kandahar in Afghanistan. The Khalils are settled in Peshawar, to the West are Afridi tribe North to Daudzai tribe and Mohmand are to the South, to East Chamkani tribe

Origins
Ghoryakhel had four sons Khalil, Daulatyar, Zeerani, Chamkani tribes. The Khalil originally lived in Ghwara Marghay Arghistan Qandahar Afghanistan, in the Qalat  Zabul and Ghazni. Khalil Mattezai  still living on the basin of the Tarnak River north of Ghazni. Sheikh Matte BaBa Shrine is close to Tarnak River on the Hill. Mongols invaded the region in 13th century, the Khalils, along with the Mohmands who were also Ghoryakhel son of Daulatyar, Daulatyar had two sons Mohmands and Daudzai, formerly settled in central Afghanistan, were driven out. The Khalil first migrated northeastwards to Kabul and then to Nangrahar further eastwards along the Kabul River. The Khalil came in 1530-1535 from Nangrahar to their present settlement in  Western part of the Peshawar valley according to the Babur history book Baburnama and Pashto History Book Pata Khazana written by Abdulhai Habibi.

References

Sarbani Pashtun tribes